Ózdi Kohász Sport Egyesület was a Hungarian football club from the town of Ózd.

History
Ózdi Kohász SE debuted in the 1961–62 season of the Hungarian League and finished thirteenth.

Name Changes 
1909–1912: Ózdi Vasgyári Sport Egylet
1912–1926: Ózdi Vasgyári Alkalmazottak Sport Egyesülete
1926–1927: Ózdi Vasgyári Testgyakorlók Köre
1926: merger with ÓvTK and Ózdi Törekvés SC
1927: merger with ÓvTK and MOVE Ózdi SE
1927–1945: MOVE Ózdi Vasgyári Testgyakorló Köre
1945–1949: Ózdi Vasas Testgyakorlók Köre
1949–1951: Ózdi Vasas SzIT Testgyakorlók Köre
1951–1959: Ózdi Vasas Sport Kör
1959–1994: Ózdi Kohász Sport Egyesület
1994: dissolved
2002: BTC Rákosmente moved to Ózd
2002–2003: Ózdi Kohász Sport Egyesület
2003: dissolved

References

External links
 Profile

Football clubs in Hungary
1909 establishments in Hungary